Minnesota Senate, District 67, encompasses portions of Ramsey County.  It has formerly included Kittson, Marshall, Roseau, Pennington, and Dakota counties.  The district is currently served by Democratic-Farmer-Labor Senator Foung Hawj.

List of senators

Recent elections

2016
The candidate filing deadline was May 31, 2016.  The primary election took place on August 9, 2016; both incumbent Foung Hawj and Krysia Weidell ran unopposed.  The general election was held on November 8, 2016, resulting in Hwaj's victory.

2012
Elections for the Minnesota State Senate occurred after state-wide redistricting from 2010.  The signature-filing deadline for candidates wishing to run in this election was June 5, 2012.  Foung Hawj defeated Tom Dimon and Robert Humphrey in the Democratic primary, and defeated Mike Capistrant in the general election.

References 

Minnesota Senate districts